Le Moal, or Moal, is a surname and may refer to:

Jean Le Moal (1909–2007), Breton French abstract painter
André Le Moal (1923–1941),  Breton French résistant shot on October 22, 1941
Colette Le Moal (born 1932), member of the National Assembly of France

Breton-language surnames